Karni may refer to:
 Karni Mata, a Hindu folk deity of Rajasthan
 Karni crossing, a border crossing between Israel and the Gaza Strip
 Western Armenian transliteration of Garni, a village and associated classical temple in Armenia
 A carnival, as run by the University of Nottingham Students' Union
 Annie Karni, American journalist 
 Asher Karni (born 1954)
 Gilad Karni
 Mika Karni
 Wolf Karni (1911–1996)
 Karni Liddell (born 1979)
 Karni Singh Rathore (1953–2005)
 Karni Singh (1924–1988)
 Karni Bhawan Palace

See also

Karri (disambiguation)